Lophocereus is a genus of cacti. It has often been merged into the genus Pachycereus, but was separated in a 2019 revision of Pachycereus, and is accepted by Plants of the World Online .

Species
, Plants of the World Online accepts the following species:

References

Echinocereeae
Cactoideae genera